Those Once Loyal is the eighth and final album by the British death metal band Bolt Thrower. It was released on 11 November 2005 in Germany, 14 November 2005 in the rest of Europe and 15 November 2005 in the United States by Metal Blade Records. It was recorded and mixed at Sable Rose Studios  in Coventry, England. It is produced by the band and Andy Faulkner. With Bolt Thrower deciding against releasing a follow-up to Those Once Loyal, it was Bolt Thrower's final studio album before breaking up a year after drummer Martin Kearns' death in September 2015.

Like all of Bolt Thrower's albums, Those Once Loyal deals with war, specifically World War I. The cover shows a World War 1 QF 18 pounder field gun and its crew in action and is based on an original WW1 photograph.
The picture is also found on the back side of the Guards Memorial in St James's Park in London.

Reception

Ian Finley praised the album in Terrorizer as "immune to the corrupting influence of all musical trends" while offering "the epitome of what a metal album should be: hard, fast and uncompromising".

Track listing
All songs written by Bolt Thrower

Personnel
Bolt Thrower
 Karl Willetts – vocals
 Gavin Ward – guitars
 Barry Thomson – guitars
 Jo Bench – bass guitar
 Martin Kearns – drums

Production
 Arranged by Bolt Thrower
 Produced by Bolt Thrower & Andy Faulkner

References

Bolt Thrower albums
2005 albums
Metal Blade Records albums